is a series of historical fantasy short stories and novels written by Japanese author Baku Yumemakura.

Most of the series was originally published as individual short stories, the first of which, originally titled just "Onmyōji", first appeared in the September 1986 issue of the publisher Bungeishunju's magazine All Yomimono, and they have since appeared across a wide variety of publications, before being republished in collections. In addition to the short stories, the series also includes novels and picture books.

A manga adaptation by Reiko Okano was serialized from 1993 to 2005; it won two major prizes (the Tezuka Osamu Cultural Prize and the Seiun Award), and begot a sequel, Onmyōji: Tamatebako, serialized from 2010 to 2017. Another manga series, Onmyōji: Taki Yashahime, by Munku Mitsuki, was serialized from 2012 to 2015.

The original stories and novels have also inspired several live-action adaptions: a Japanese television drama series was broadcast on NHK G in 2001; two films directed by Yojiro Takita were released in 2001 and 2003; two TV movies were broadcast on TV Asahi in 2015 and 2020; a Chinese live-action film directed by Guo Jingming was released in 2020. An original net anime adaptation by Marvy Jack is set to premiere on Netflix in 2023.

A Chinese video game loosely based on the series was released in 2018, and this in turn inspired a different Chinese live-action film, directed by Li Weiran, released in 2021. It also been adapted for the stage several times.

Publication

Written by Baku Yumemakura, the original "Onmyōji" short story first appeared in the Bungeishunju's All Yomimono in the September 1986 issue. Since then, additional short stories have been published across a wide variety of different publications, then later compiled and republished in both  and  format, with the first collection published by Bungeishunju on August 10, 1988, and on February 9, 1991, in these formats respectively.

Three picture books with illustrations by Yutaka Murakami have also been published by Bungeishunju in 2001, 2003, and 2005.

Short story collections

Novel length-stories

Picture books

Adaptations

Films
 In 2001, it was adapted into the film Onmyōji, followed by the 2003 sequel, Onmyōji 2; both were directed by Yōjirō Takita.
 A Chinese adaptation of the original short stories and novels, titled The Yin-Yang Master: Dream of Eternity, was released in China on December 25, 2020, and outside China on Netflix on February 5, 2021
 A different Chinese film, titled The Yinyang Master, was released in China on February 12, 2021, and outside China on Netflix on March 19, 2021. This film is adapted from the video game Onmyoji, which is based on the Onmyōji series of short stories and novels.

Manga
A manga adaptation by Reiko Okano was serialized in two magazines between 1993 and 2005: It started in 's  manga magazine , where it ran from the July 1993 issue to the April 1996 issue. Afterward, Comic Burger was relaunched as Comic Birz, and the series ran from the July 1996 issue to the May 1999 issue. It then transferred to Hakusensha's  manga magazine Melody, where it ran from the August 1999 issue to the May 2005 issue.

Schola compiled the series into  and released eight volumes between July 1994 and December 1998. Later, Hakusensha republished the older volumes with new volumes for a total of 13  released between July 12, 1999, and September 29, 2005. The first seven volumes were published in France by Delcourt between 2007 and 2013. Music for Onmyo-Ji, an accompanying image album with manga artist Okano's participation as performer, was released in 2000.

An exhibit at the Kyoto International Manga Museum explored "the supernatural aspects of Kyoto" by using this manga as reference. The manga received the Grand Prize at the 2001 Tezuka Osamu Cultural Prizes. The series also received the Seiun Award for best science fiction comic in 2006. Also, in 2011, Paul Gravett included it in the book 1001 Comics You Must Read Before You Die.

A sequel manga series, also written by Okano, titled , was announced on October 28, 2010, and was serialized in Melody from December 28, 2010, to April 28, 2017. Between December 28, 2011, and July 28, 2017, seven bound volumes were released by Hakusensha.

A manga adaptation of  written by Munku Mitsuki was serialized in Tokuma Shoten's magazine Monthly Comic Ryū between March 19, 2012, and December 20, 2015. Eight  volumes were released by Tokuma Shoten from September 13, 2012, to January 13, 2016.

Television
The novel has been adapted into three different television dramas. The first is a 10-episode series starring Goro Inagaki that was broadcast by NHK in 2001. The second is a TV movie starring Matsumoto Kōshirō X (then Ichikawa Somegorō VII) that was broadcast by TV Asahi in 2015. The third is another TV movie, starring Kuranosuke Sasaki, that was also broadcast on TV Asahi, on March 29, 2020.

Anime
An original net anime adaptation was announced during Netflix's "Tudum" virtual event in late September 2022. The series is directed by Soubi Yamamoto and produced by Marvy Jack, with scripts written by Natsu Hashimoto and Yuiko Kato. It is set to premiere on Netflix in 2023.

References

External links

Onmyōji (manga) at Hakusensha's site

1986 Japanese novels
1993 manga
2023 anime ONAs
Book series introduced in 1986
Fantasy anime and manga
Gentosha manga
Hakusensha manga
Historical anime and manga
Japanese novels adapted into films
Japanese serial novels
Netflix original anime
Seinen manga
Josei manga
Tokuma Shoten manga
Upcoming Netflix original programming
Winner of Tezuka Osamu Cultural Prize (Grand Prize)